Expreso Aéreo was a small Peruvian regional airline based at Jorge Chávez International Airport. It was a passenger and cargo airline that operated from 1991 until 1997.

Accidents
On September 10, 1992  a Fokker F27 (reg. OB-1443) operated by Expreso Aéreo was landing in the Amazon jungle town of Bellavista (in the district of the same name) after a flight from Tarapoto. The tire of the Fokker's front landing gear burst on contact with the ground, causing the plane to spin out of control and veer off the runway, breaking in three parts and killing the pilot. The six remaining crew and the 36 passengers survived.

On February 25, 1994, an Expreso Aéreo Yakovlev Yak-40 (just recently delivered to the airline) struck Mount Carpish six minutes after leaving Tingo María for Lima, killing all 26 passengers and five crew members. The aircraft was reportedly piloted by two Russians and one Peruvian.

Destinations 

 Jorge Chávez International Airport, Lima
 Alejandro Velasco Astete International Airport, Cuzco
 Crnl. FAP Francisco Secada Vignetta International Airport, Iquitos
 Tingo María Airport, Tingo María
 Alférez FAP David Figueroa Fernandini Airport, Huánuco
 Cad. FAP Guillermo del Castillo Paredes Airport, Tarapoto

Fleet 

 Antonov An-24
 Antonov An-32
 Boeing 727-200
 Fokker F27
 Yakovlev Yak-40

References

Defunct airlines of Peru
Airlines established in 1991
Airlines disestablished in 1997